Bedford Rural District was a rural district in Bedfordshire, England from 1894 to 1974. It surrounded but did not include the Municipal Borough of Bedford and Kempston Urban District.

Evolution
The district had its origins in the Bedford Rural Sanitary District. This had been created under the Public Health Acts of 1872 and 1875, giving public health and local government responsibilities for rural areas to the existing Boards of Guardians of Poor Law Unions.

Under the Local Government Act 1894, Rural Sanitary Districts became Rural Districts from 28 December 1894. Where Rural Sanitary Districts straddled county boundaries, they were to be split or otherwise adjusted so that each new Rural District was in one county. Whilst the Bedford Rural Sanitary District was entirely in Bedfordshire, the neighbouring Wellingborough Rural Sanitary District straddled Northamptonshire and Bedfordshire as it included two small Bedfordshire parishes at Podington and Wymington. An order was made prior to the new councils coming into force directing that Podington and Wymington should join the Bedford Rural District.

The link with the Poor Law Union continued, with all the elected councillors of the Rural District Council being ex officio members of the Board of Guardians for Bedford (or Wellingborough for those two parishes). The first meeting of the new council was held on 5 January 1895 in the board room of the Bedford Union Workhouse. The council's first chairman, Major William Francis Higgins, had been the chairman of the previous Bedford Board of Guardians.

Kempston was initially included within Bedford Rural District, but work began almost immediately to create an urban district council for the more built-up part of the parish. In June 1895 Bedfordshire County Council decided that the parish of Kempston should be split between a Kempston Urban District and a new parish called Kempston Rural which was to stay in the Bedford Rural District. These changes came into force on 1 April 1896.

Bedford Rural District was enlarged in 1934 when it took in the territory of the disbanded Eaton Socon Rural District.

Parishes
Bedford Rural District contained the following civil parishes.

Premises
From its formation until the 1920s the council generally met at the Bedford Union Workhouse. By 1929 the council was meeting at the Town Hall in Bedford. Administrative offices were nearby at 6A St Mary's Street. In 1958 the council moved to a pair of large Victorian houses at 41-43 Goldington Road in Bedford, and gradually acquired adjoining properties. By the time of the council's abolition in 1974 it occupied numbers 37-45 (odds) Goldington Road.

Abolition
In 1974, under the Local Government Act 1972, it was merged with Bedford borough and Kempston Urban District to form the new Bedford district. The old council's former offices on Goldington Road continued to be used as offices by the new authority for several years.

References

Districts of England abolished by the Local Government Act 1972
Districts of England created by the Local Government Act 1894
History of Bedfordshire
Local government in Bedfordshire
Rural districts of England